Protrusio acetabuli is an uncommon defect of the acetabulum, the socket that receives the femoral head to make the hip joint. The hip bone of the pelvic bone/girdle is composed of three bones, the ilium, the ischium and the pubis. In protrusio deformity, there is medial displacement of the femoral head in that the medial aspect of the femoral cortex is medial to the ilioischial line. The socket is too deep and may protrude into the pelvis.

Signs and symptoms
Protrusio acetabuli may be asymptomatic. Limitation of joint range of movement is the earliest sign, along with pain.

Classification
Protrusio acetabuli is divided into two types, primary and secondary.
 Primary protrusio acetabuli are characterized by progressive protrusio in middle aged women, and may be associated with osteoarthritis. They may be familial.
 Secondary protrusio acetabuli'''s causes include femoral head prosthesis, cup arthroplasty, septic arthritis, central fracture dislocation, or total hip replacement surgeryProtrusio acetabuli may also be thought of as unilateral or bilateral.
 Unilateral protrusio acetabuli may be caused by tuberculous arthritis, trauma, or fibrous dysplasia.
 Bilateral protrusio acetabuli may be caused by rheumatoid arthritis, Paget's disease, osteomalacia, Marfan syndrome, and ankylosing spondylitis.

Prognosis
The protrusio'' may progress until the femoral neck impinges against the pelvis.

Treatment
Arthroscopic surgery (or open joint surgery) is an effective treatment. Joint replacement surgery may be necessary in the case of severe pain or substantial joint restriction.

References

External links 

 

Arthritis
Pelvis
Arthropathies